Roderick MacKinnon (born February 19, 1956) is an American biophysicist, neuroscientist, and businessman. He is a professor of Molecular Neurobiology and Biophysics at Rockefeller University who won the Nobel Prize in Chemistry together with Peter Agre in 2003 for his work on the structure and operation of ion channels.

Biography

Early life and education
MacKinnon was born in Burlington, Massachusetts and initially attended the University of Massachusetts Boston. MacKinnon then transferred to Brandeis University after one year, and there he received a bachelor's degree in biochemistry in 1978, studying calcium transport through the cell membrane for his honors thesis in Christopher Miller's laboratory. It was also at Brandeis where MacKinnon met his future wife and working-colleague Alice Lee.

After receiving his bachelor’s degree from Brandeis University, MacKinnon entered medical school at Tufts University. He got his M.D. in 1982 and received training in Internal Medicine at Beth Israel Hospital in Boston. He did not feel satisfied enough with the medical profession, so in 1986 he returned to Christopher Miller's laboratory at Brandeis for postdoctoral studies.

Career
In 1989 he was appointed assistant professor at Harvard University where he studied the interaction of the potassium channel with a specific toxin derived from scorpion venom, acquainting himself with methods of protein purification and X-ray crystallography. In 1996 he moved to Rockefeller University as a professor and head of the Laboratory of Molecular Neurobiology and Biophysics where he started to work on the structure of the potassium channel. These channels are of particular importance to the nervous system and the heart and enable potassium ions to cross the cell membrane.

Scientific contributions
Potassium channels demonstrate a seemingly counterintuitive activity: they permit the passage of potassium ions, whereas they do not allow the passage of the much smaller sodium ions. Before MacKinnon's work, the detailed molecular architecture of potassium channels and the exact means by which they conduct ions remained speculative.

In 1998, despite barriers to the structural study of integral membrane proteins that had thwarted most attempts for decades, MacKinnon and colleagues determined the three-dimensional molecular structure of a potassium channel from an actinobacterium, Streptomyces lividans, utilizing X-ray crystallography. With this structure and other biochemical experiments, MacKinnon and colleagues were able to explain the exact mechanism by which potassium channel selectivity occurs.

His prize-winning research was conducted primarily at the Cornell High Energy Synchrotron Source (CHESS) of Cornell University, and at the National Synchrotron Light Source (NSLS) of Brookhaven National Laboratory.

MacKinnon was elected to the American Philosophical Society in 2005. In 2007 he became a foreign member of the Royal Netherlands Academy of Arts and Sciences.

Awards and recognition 

 1997: Newcomb Cleveland Prize
 1998: W. Alden Spencer Award
 1999: Albert Lasker Basic Medical Research Award 
 2000: Rosenstiel Award
 2001: Gairdner Foundation International Award
 2003: Louisa Gross Horwitz Prize
 2003: Nobel Prize in Chemistry

Business activities
MacKinnon is co-inventor with his friend and scientific collaborator, neurobiologist Bruce Bean of Harvard Medical School, of a dietary supplement for treating and preventing muscle cramps; they tested it in clinical trials and are co-founders a company to commercialize their invention, Flex Pharma. Christoph Westphal and Jennifer Cermak were co-founders as well.   The company undertook drug development of a formulation of supplement as a drug candidate for neuromuscular disorders like ALS, and raised a $40 million Series A round.  The company had an $86 million initial public offering in 2015.  In 2016, the company launched "HotShot" as a dietary supplement for endurance athletes.  In June 2018 the company halted clinical development of the drug candidate due to tolerability issues, cut its workforce, and said it was considering its strategy. In July 2018 MacKinnon resigned from the board of directors.

References

External links 
 Interview with Roderick MacKinnon by Harry Kroto Freeview video provided by the Vega Science Trust.
 Website of his lab at The Rockefeller University
 Ion Channel Chemistry: The Electrical System of Life Transcribed video of a May 2008 talk by MacKinnon, sponsored by the Oregon State University Libraries.
 Nobel Lecture by Roderick MacKinnon, 2003
 

1956 births
Living people
20th-century American physicists
21st-century American physicists
American biophysicists
American company founders
American inventors
American neuroscientists
American Nobel laureates
Bijvoet Medal recipients
Brandeis University alumni
Brookhaven National Laboratory Nobel laureates
Businesspeople from Massachusetts
Chief executives in the pharmaceutical industry
Harvard University faculty
Howard Hughes Medical Investigators
Members of the Royal Netherlands Academy of Arts and Sciences
Members of the United States National Academy of Sciences
Nobel laureates in Chemistry
People from Burlington, Massachusetts
Recipients of the Albert Lasker Award for Basic Medical Research
Scientists from Massachusetts
Tufts University School of Medicine alumni
Members of the American Philosophical Society